Berryville is an incorporated town in and the county seat of Clarke County,  Virginia, United States. The population was 4,574 at the 2020 census, up from 4,185 at the 2010 census.

History
Berryville was founded at the intersection of the Winchester Turnpike and Charlestown Road. The land was first granted by the Crown to Captain Isaac Pennington in 1734, and George Washington surveyed it on October 23, 1750. In 1754, Pennington sold the land to Colonel John Hite.
 	

According to legend, Daniel Morgan would engage in combat with young toughs at the intersection, having first piled large stones nearby to use as ammunition in case of need. Because of this story, and a rowdy tavern nearby, the area was first given the informal name of "Battle Town".

Hite sold the tract in 1765 to his son-in-law, Major Charles Smith. Smith named his estate "Battle Town", and on the site of the former tavern he built a clapboard homestead. This structure still stands on what is now Main Street and is now known as "The Nook".

Daniel Morgan returned to the area after distinguishing himself in the Revolution, living at Saratoga, and briefly at Soldier's Rest. He was one of the frequent (and reputedly most quarrelsome) patrons of the new tavern (where now stands the Battletown Inn).

Major Smith's son, John Smith, in 1797 sold  of his inheritance to Benjamin Berry and Sarah (Berry) Stribling, who divided it into lots for a town. It was established as the town of Berryville on January 15, 1798.

By 1810, the town had at least 25 homes, three stores, an apothecary (pharmacy), two taverns, and an academy (school). It was not much larger when it was designated as the county seat of newly formed Clarke County in 1836. An 1855 gazetteer described it as "a small town" that "has some trade, and contains an academy and 1 or 2 churches."

In the Gettysburg Campaign, the town was used as an outpost supporting Winchester during Second Battle of Winchester. In 1864 General Jubal A. Early briefly had his headquarters in the town. Not long afterward the Battle of Berryville was fought in and around the town during the Valley Campaigns of 1864.

The railroad reached the town in the 1870s.

Virginia governor and U.S. senator Harry F. Byrd long resided in Berryville. A state senator in 1916, he built a log cabin named "Westwood" (a name he also gave his daughter) in Berryville at a family-owned orchard. The cabin was constructed from chestnut logs prior to the chestnut blight. In 1926, Byrd purchased Rosemont, an estate adjacent to his family's apple orchards in Berryville. He moved there with his family after his term as governor ended in 1929.

Geography

U.S. Route 340 passes through the center of town, leading northeast  to Charles Town, West Virginia, and southwest  to Front Royal. Virginia State Route 7 bypasses Berryville along its northern border as a four-lane freeway, leading west to Winchester and east across the Blue Ridge Mountains  to Leesburg.

Demographics

As of the census of 2000, there were 2,963 people, 1,239 households, and 783 families residing in the town. The population density was 1,648.3 people per square mile (635.6/km2). There were 1,312 housing units at an average density of 729.8 per square mile (281.4/km2). The racial makeup of the town was 84.54% White, 13.60% African American, 0.10% Native American, 0.57% Asian, 0.13% from other races, and 1.05% from two or more races. Hispanic or Latino of any race were 1.32% of the population.

There were 1,239 households, out of which 28.6% had children under the age of 18 living with them, 46.7% were married couples living together, 13.1% had a female householder with no husband present, and 36.8% were non-families. 32.8% of all households were made up of individuals, and 18.6% had someone living alone who was 65 years of age or older. The average household size was 2.28 and the average family size was 2.90.

In the town, the population was spread out, with 23.1% under the age of 18, 5.7% from 18 to 24, 27.3% from 25 to 44, 21.5% from 45 to 64, and 22.5% who were 65 years of age or older. The median age was 41 years. For every 100 females, there were 81.2 males. For every 100 females age 18 and over, there were 74.1 males.

The median income for a household in the town was $39,871, and the median income for a family was $52,176. Males had a median income of $38,750 versus $26,531 for females. The per capita income for the town was $20,337. About 4.1% of families and 7.0% of the population were below the poverty line, including 6.5% of those under age 18 and 16.3% of those age 65 or over.

Transportation
Berryville is located at the intersection of U.S. Route 340 and Virginia State Route 7. US 340 passes through the center of town, extending southwest to Front Royal and northeast to Charles Town. SR 7 bypasses the town just to the north, extending west to Winchester and east to Leesburg. US 340 also connects to Interstate 66 near Front Royal while SR 7 has a junction with Interstate 81 near Winchester. While SR 7 now bypasses downtown Berryville, SR 7 Business still passes through via Main Street.

Education
Berryville is home to D.G. Cooley Elementary School, Johnson Williams Middle School and Clarke County High School.

Climate
The climate in this area is characterized by hot, humid summers and generally mild to cool winters.  According to the Köppen Climate Classification system, Berryville has a humid subtropical climate, abbreviated "Cfa" on climate maps.

Notable buildings or structures in Berryville
 J & L Pie Co. - Established in 1899
 Clarke County High School 
 Holy Cross Abbey - Trappist monastery
 Soldier's Rest - 1769
 Historic Rosemont Manor - former home of Governor and U.S. Senator Harry F. Byrd 
In addition to Soldier's Rest, the Berryville Historic District, Chapel Hill, Clermont, Cool Spring Battlefield, Fairfield, Glendale Farm, Josephine City School, Long Marsh Run Rural Historic District, Norwood, Old Clarke County Courthouse, Smithfield Farm, and Wickliffe Church are listed on the National Register of Historic Places.

Notable people 
 Harry F. Byrd, Virginia governor and U.S. senator
 Rennie Davis, 1960s anti-war organizer; Chicago Seven defendant; author
 Drew Gilpin Faust, president of Harvard University
 James Noble, first U.S. senator for Indiana
 Noah Noble, brother of James Noble and a Whig Party governor of Indiana
 Forrest Pritchard, New York Times bestselling author and sustainable farmer
 Oliver North, former US Marine Corps lieutenant colonel involved in the Iran–Contra affair; Fox News analyst
 Lloyd W. Williams, Marine officer who died in World War I, credited with saying "Retreat? Hell, we just got here!"

See also
 Mount Weather Emergency Operations Center

References

External links 

 

Towns in Clarke County, Virginia
Towns in Virginia
County seats in Virginia